Bezugly or Bezuhly is a surname. Its feminine forms are Bezuhla and Bezuglaya. Notable people include:

 Ivan Bezugly (1897–1983), Soviet-Ukrainian Red Army officer
  (born 1988), Ukrainian politician
 Sergiy Bezugliy (born 1984), Ukrainian and Azerbaijani sprint canoeist

Ukrainian-language surnames